Berkay Enes Taşkıran (born January 17, 1997) is a Turkish professional basketball player who plays as Shooting guard for Frutti Extra Bursaspor of the Turkish Basketbol Süper Ligi (BSL).

References

External links
Berkay Taşkıran Basketball Champions League Profile
Berkay Taşkıran TBLStat.net Profile
Berkay Taşkıran Eurobasket Profile
Berkay Taşkıran TBL Profile

Living people
1997 births
Beşiktaş men's basketball players
Bursaspor Basketbol players
Büyükçekmece Basketbol players
Shooting guards
Basketball players from Istanbul
Turkish men's basketball players
Türk Telekom B.K. players
Yeşilgiresun Belediye players